Murray High School is a public high school located in Murray, Kentucky, United States. Currently, the school is on Sycamore Street, but from 1872-1971 it was located at 801 Main Street, in the building now used for Murray Middle School.

Extracurricular activities

Athletics

The Murray High Lady Tiger Basketball team is currently the most successful sport at the school. During former head coach Rechelle Turner's 21-year tenure from 1997 to 2017, the team had unprecedented success. Perhaps the most notable accomplishments of the Lady Tigers are their two back to back KHSAA Final Four appearances in 2016 and 2017, along with a Class A state championship in 2016 and 2018. Additionally, the Lady Tigers were Region 1 champions in 1997, 2010, 2016, and 2017. Turner is now the head women's basketball coach at NCAA Division I Murray State University.

Murray's football team is well-known across Kentucky to be one of the best in Class AA. Murray High School had undefeated regular seasons in 2009 and 2010. The program has reached the third or fourth round of KHSAA Class AA Playoffs each year from 2009-2014.  Prior to moving to Class AA, Murray High School won the Class A state championship in 1961 and 1974.

The Murray girls' track and field team won the KHSAA Class A state championship in 2016 and 2017.

Archery
Baseball
Basketball
Cheerleading
Cross country
Dance
Football
Golf
Marching Band
Soccer
Softball
Swimming
Tennis
Track and field
Volleyball-Ladies

Murray Tiger Band 
Since its inception nearly 90 years ago, Murray High School's band has arguably been the most successful activity at the school, if not the district. The band has performed at Carnegie Hall in New York City, Meyerson Symphony Center in Dallas, and Walt Disney World in Florida. The Murray Tiger Band is currently under the direction of Tim Zeiss.

Accomplishments 
 BOA Grand National Champion - 1977
 BOA Class A National Champion - 2021
 KMEA State Champion
 Class A - 2017, 2018
 Class AAA - 2021
 KMEA 2nd Place
 Class A - 1997, 2009, 2013, 2015
 Class AA - 2007, 2019
 Class AAA - 2022
 KMEA 3rd Place
 Class A - 1987, 2005, 2006, 2008, 2010, 2011, 2012, 2014, 2016
 KMEA 4th Place
 Class AA - 2001
 KMEA State Finalist - 1987, 1997, 2001, 2005, 2006, 2007, 2008, 2009, 2010, 2011, 2012, 2013, 2014, 2015, 2016, 2017, 2018, 2019, 2021, 2022
 KMEA West Regional Champion
 Class A - 2005, 2006, 2008, 2009, 2010, 2011, 2012, 2013, 2014, 2015, 2016, 2017, 2018
 Class AA - 2001, 2004, 2007, 2019
 Class AAA - 2021, 2022
 BOA Class A Super Regional Champion (Indianapolis) - 2016
 BOA Class A Super Regional Champion (St. Louis) - 2006
 Murray State Festival of Champions Grand Champion - 1976, 1977, 2012, 2015, 2019, 2021, 2022
 Murray State Festival of Champions Reserve Grand Champion - 1978, 1979, 2002, 2005, 2011
 MTSU Contest of Champions Finalist - 1975, 1976, 1977, 1978, 1979

Notable performances 

Macy's Thanksgiving Day Parade - 1980
 Orange Bowl Parade - 1975, 1977

Notable alumni
Shane Andrus, football placekicker
Gordon Cooper, Mercury-Atlas 9 astronaut
Tim Masthay, punter for the Green Bay Packers
Mel Purcell, tennis player
Molly Sims, model and actress

Historical timeline

1872: Community leaders raise money to build the Murray Male and Female Institute, recognized as "the finest school in the Jackson Purchase"
1900: The Institute catches fire (in "some unaccountable way," according to a contemporary account) and burns to the ground. The new "Murray Graded School Building" is built with state funds. It houses grades 1-12 in the Murray Independent School District.  However, this second school building catches fire in 1919 during the Christmas break and also burns to the ground. It is believed that the fire was caused by students smoking and gambling in the boiler room.
1922: A new three-story schoolhouse is completed. It includes an auditorium, a large library, and several classrooms.
1930: The west wing, with several classrooms, a gymnasium and locker rooms, a home economics lab, and an unfinished third floor, is added onto the building.
1939: Ty Holland Stadium is built by Roosevelt's Civilian Conservation Corps and named for the Murray City School's highly respected teacher and coach.
1953: With the construction of Austin Elementary (named for A.B. Austin, long-time member of the Murray Board of Education), the Murray school building becomes Murray High School.
1958: The "Band and Manual Arts" building is added onto the Murray High campus to house band, music, and industrial arts.
1971: The new Murray High School is built on Doran Road, and the school system is reorganized to include four years of elementary school, five years of middle school, and four years of high school.

References

External links
 

Educational institutions established in 1872
Public high schools in Kentucky
Civilian Conservation Corps in Kentucky
Schools in Calloway County, Kentucky
1872 establishments in Kentucky
Murray, Kentucky